Ermineskin Cree Nation  also known as the Ermineskin Tribe, is a Cree First Nations band government in Alberta, Canada. A signatory to Treaty 6, Ermineskin is one of the Four Nations of Maskwacis, Alberta's largest Indigenous community.

As of 2019, there are 4,879 registered Ermineskin Cree, of which 3,290 were living on reserve.

The Ermineskin Cree Nation's two reserves (around Maskwacis, Alberta) total about 22,512 hectares and lived in an area around Pigeon Lake and the Bear Hills (known in Cree as ). While the Ermineskin traditional territory includes the reserve lands, the reserve was formally established in 1885. The land houses substantial oil and gas deposits, agricultural land, and waterfront access to Pigeon Lake. The Canadian Pacific Railway line runs through the reserve.

The First Nation took its name from Ermineskin Kosikosowayano also known as Baptiste Piche), Chief of the Bear Hills Cree. He was the son of Peechee ( - "Mountain Lion", also known as Louis Piche), Chief of the Asini Wachi Nehiyawak (Cree groups of the Rocky/Mountain Cree) and later head chief of the Rocky Mountain Cree ( or ) and also brother-in-law of Pitikwahanapiwiyin (′Poundmaker′), Chief of the River Cree ( or ). Ermineskin was the younger brother of the well-known  - Bobtail, also known as Alexis Piche), who became Chief of the Bear Hills Cree after the death of their father Louie Piche also known as Pisu) who was the chief of the Rocky Cree ( or ) and became later head chief of the Western Cree (‘Pakisimotan Wi Iniwak’) and soon after head chief of all the groups of the Upstream People ( or ).

Indian Reserves
There are two Indian reserves under the governance of the band:
Ermineskin Indian Reserve No. 138, 10295.8 ha.
Pigeon Lake Indian Reserve No. 138A, 1921 ha.
Pigeon Lake IR No. 138A is shared with three other governments, the Samson First Nation, the Louis Bull First Nation and the Montana First Nation.

Notable members
Chief Randy Ermineskin 
Willie Littlechild

References

External links
 

First Nations governments in Alberta
Cree governments